Debt of Honour is a 1936 British drama film directed by Norman Walker and starring Leslie Banks, Will Fyffe, Geraldine Fitzgerald and Garry Marsh. Based on a story by Sapper, and scripted by Tom Geraghty and Cyril Campion, the film is also known as The Man Who Could Not Forget.

It was made at British and Dominions Elstree Studios by British National Films.

Premise
A Colonel's daughter steals from the regimental mess funds to pay off her gambling debts. One of the officers, who is love with her, takes the blame, and is sent to Africa.

Cast
 Leslie Banks as Major Jimmie Stanton
 Will Fyffe as Fergus McAndrews
 Geraldine Fitzgerald as Peggy Mayhew
 Niall MacGinnis as Lieutenant Peter Stretton
 Reginald Purdell as Pedro Salvas
 Garry Marsh as Bill
 Stewart Rome as Major Purvis
 Phyllis Dare as Mrs Stretton
 Joyce Kennedy as Lady Bracebury
 William Kendall as Paul Martin
 Randle Ayrton as Captain Turner
 Eric Cowley as Richard Denham
 David Horne as Colonel Mayhew
 Kathleen Davis as Kamara

References

Bibliography
 Low, Rachael. Filmmaking in 1930s Britain. George Allen & Unwin, 1985.
 Wood, Linda. British Films, 1927-1939. British Film Institute, 1986.

External links

1936 films
1936 drama films
1930s English-language films
British drama films
Films set in England
Films directed by Norman Walker
Films shot at Imperial Studios, Elstree
British black-and-white films
1930s British films